was a Japanese football player.

Club career
Haruyama was born in Tokyo on April 4, 1906. He played for Tokyo Imperial University LB was consisted of his alma mater Tokyo Imperial University players and graduates.

National team career
In August 1927, when Haruyama was a Mito High School student, he was selected Japan national team for 1927 Far Eastern Championship Games in Shanghai. At this competition, on August 27, he debuted against Republic of China. On August 29, he also played against Philippines, and Japan won this match. This is Japan national team first victory in International A Match. He also played at 1930 Far Eastern Championship Games in Tokyo and Japan won the championship. He played 4 games for Japan until 1930.

After retirement
After retirement, Haruyama joined Nikkan Sports in 1946.

On June 17, 1987, Haruyama died of a bleeding of gastrointestinal tract in Toshima, Tokyo at the age of 81.

National team statistics

References

External links
 
 Japan National Football Team Database

1906 births
1987 deaths
University of Tokyo alumni
Association football people from Tokyo
Japanese footballers
Japan international footballers
Association football forwards